Helen of Tottenham was an English visionary associated with Elizabeth Barton, during the reign of Henry VIII. Barton described Helen's visions as 'delusions of the devil.' She came to the attention of Thomas More, who wrote about her.

References

Year of birth unknown
Year of death unknown
16th-century English women
People from Tottenham